The Daher Lake South Hospital is a privately owned brazilian hospital, located in the administrative region of Lago Sul, in the Federal District. It was founded by Dr. José Carlos Daher, plastic surgeon, in 1978.

References

Hospital buildings completed in 1978
Hospitals in Federal District (Brazil)
1978 establishments in Brazil
Hospitals established in 1978